Ronald L. Cohen was a social psychologist whose research was focused on justice.  He was born in 1945 and died in 2020. He was a faculty member at Bennington College and the co-author or editor of several books and numerous peer-reviewed journal articles, including:

 Equity and Justice in Social Behavior, 1982
 Justice: Views from the Social Sciences (Critical Issues in Social Justice), 1986
 Political Attitudes over the Life Span: The Bennington Women After Fifty Years (Life Course Studies), 1992

In addition to his work as a researcher and teacher, Cohen served as a dean at Bennington College, as a co-founder of the Bennington Community Justice Center, and as a member of the Bennington County Reparative Board.

A native of Chicago, he held an undergraduate degree from the University of Minnesota and a Ph.D. from the University of Michigan.

21st-century American psychologists
Social psychologists
American sociologists
University of Minnesota alumni
Living people
University of Michigan alumni
Year of birth missing (living people)